Whatever It Takes is a 2000 American teen comedy film directed by David Raynr and starring Shane West, Marla Sokoloff, Jodi Lyn O'Keefe, and James Franco. It was released in the United States on March 31, 2000. The film’s story is a modern update of the 1897 play Cyrano de Bergerac by Edmond Rostand.

Plot
Ryan Woodman is a bit of a geek with eyes for the school’s most popular girl, Ashley Grant. This induces cringing in his neighbor and best friend, Maggie Carter, a cute, intellectual girl. Football jock Chris Campbell, who happens to be Ashley’s cousin, has his eye on Maggie, and he offers to help Ryan get the girl of his dreams if Ryan does the same for him. Ryan and Chris agree on the deal, which has Ryan compose soulful e-mails for Chris to use on Maggie, while Chris advises Ryan to treat Ashley like dirt, with the reasoning it’s the only way to get her attention.

At first, neither guy finds it easy to change their ways; Chris comes on too strong for Maggie’s liking, and Ryan is too nervous to be a jerk to Ashley. But as they start to succeed, Ryan begins to see Maggie in a new light and wonders if he's pursuing the right girl. He realizes Ashley is not meant for him just as he tries to convince Maggie of Chris's affection for her. Meanwhile, Maggie questions her own interest in the narcissistic Chris. Ryan’s change in behavior, which includes insulting his geeky friends, also sinks Maggie’s opinion of him. Ryan learns Chris plans to “nail and bail” Maggie on the night of the school prom, a strategy he’s done with every girl he’s dated. Ryan tells Chris that this won’t work because Maggie is too good for that, but he blithely ignores him.

Ryan ends up confessing his feelings for Maggie and admits to her it was him writing her the romantic letters the whole time, not Chris. Feeling let down by the dishonesty, Maggie is hesitant to reciprocate his feelings. She ends up going to the prom with Chris while Ryan begrudgingly goes with Ashley. At an afterparty in a hotel, before Chris can get Maggie into bed, Maggie insists on tying him to the bed and blindfolding him, which he obliges. When Chris is fully restrained, Maggie tells him she has just played him and takes a Polaroid of him in the humiliating position. She leaves Chris in the room to be taunted and drawn on by other partygoers. Ryan ends up ditching Ashley and goes after Maggie. Back at their homes, Ryan tries to talk to Maggie over the balcony and apologizes for his wrongdoings. Maggie tells him how hurt she is over the deception, which had steered her into Chris’s popular clique and led her to mistakenly feel like she belonged, and he replies that she does belong – with him. They then realize their feelings for one another and kiss.

Cast

Home media

Whatever It Takes was released on VHS and DVD in North America in August 2000. It was released in Australia later that year, then released in the UK in 2001.

Reception
The film has an approval rating on Rotten Tomatoes of 16% based on 67 reviews. The site's critical consensus reads, "Whatever It Takes is another run-of-the-mill teeny-bopper romance flick. Cliche jokes and a tired plot capture few laughs". A.O. Scott of The New York Times criticized the film’s predictable plot, and pointed out that “the script's way of handling its romantic complications is unusually obtuse and insensitive.” Scott said the film’s treatment of the Ashley character, who is humiliated for laughs, “strikes an ugly, misogynist note.”

Owen Gleiberman of Entertainment Weekly said the film had "ersatz versions of stars who, in this case, are fairly vanilla to begin with".

Accolades

 Teen Choice Awards
 Choice Comedy Movie: Nominated
 Choice Movie Sleazebag: Nominated
 Choice Movie Hissy Fit: Nominated

References

External links
 
 
 

2000 films
2000s high school films
2000 romantic comedy films
2000s teen comedy films
American teen comedy films
American teen romance films
American sex comedy films
Columbia Pictures films
Films based on Cyrano de Bergerac (play)
Films scored by Edward Shearmur
Phoenix Pictures films
Films about proms
Films set in California
Films shot in Los Angeles
2000s English-language films
Films directed by David Raynr
2000s American films